Mataqucha (Quechua mata united, qucha lake, "united lake", Hispanicized spellings Matacocha, Matacochas) is a mountain in the Andes of Peru, about  high, at a small lake of the same name. The mountain is located in the Lima Region, Cajatambo Province, Gorgor District, in the Huaura Province, Ambar District, and in the Oyón Province, Caujul District. It lies southeast of Wathiyaqucha and Puka Parya.

The mountain is named after a little lake south and east of the mountain.

References

Mountains of Peru
Mountains of Lima Region
Lakes of Peru
Lakes of Lima Region